Megan Ryther  (born July 3, 1979, in Kankakee, IL) is a female freestyle swimmer from United States. She represented her native country at the 1998 World Aquatics Championships in Perth, Western Australia, competing in one individual events (5 km). She competes in open water and her last result was 17th place in World Open Water Championship in 2003.

References
USA Swimming
https://www.the-sports.org/megan-ryther-nuoto-spf81755.html

1979 births
Living people
American female freestyle swimmers
American female swimmers